Schultz Lake is a lake in Meeker County, in the U.S. state of Minnesota.

Schultz Lake was named for the Schultz brothers, local German settlers.

See also
List of lakes in Minnesota

References

Lakes of Minnesota
Lakes of Meeker County, Minnesota